Legacy of Love is a live CD/DVD from Christian singer David Phelps. It was released on September 12, 2006 by Word Records.

Track listing

DVD

 "Virtuoso" (Intro)
 "Virtuoso" (Hamm, Phelps)
 "Arms Open Wide" (Baloche)
 "How Great Thou Art" (Hine)
 "Already There" (Hamm, Phelps)
 "God Will Take Care of You" (Clark, Fowler, Walls)
 "Just as I Am" (Bradbury, Elliot, Public Domain)
 "Just as I Am" (Morgan, Phelps)
 "My Child Is Coming Home" (Jennings, Penrod, Phelps)
 "With His Love (Sing Holy)" (Cox)
 "Legacy of Love" (Morgan, Phelps)
 "Bring Him Home" (Boublil, Kretzmer, Schönberg)
 "The Star-Spangled Banner" (Key, Phelps, Smith)
 "There Is a River" (Sapp, Sapp)
 "Gentle Savior" (Brick, Matthews, Phelps)
 "Interlude: Behold the Lamb"
 "Behold the Lamb" (Rambo)
 "End of the Beginning" (Phelps)

CD

 "Virtuoso" (Intro) - 1:39
 "Virtuoso" (Hamm, Phelps) - 5:03
 "How Great Thou Art" (Hine) - 3:29
 "Already There" (Hamm, Phelps) - 5:21
 "God Will Take Care of You" (Clark, Fowler, Walls) - 4:55
 "Just as I Am" (Bradbury, Elliot, Public Domain) - 0:53
 "Just as I Am" (Morgan, Phelps) - 3:52
 "My Child Is Coming Home" (Jennings, Penrod, Phelps) - 3:23
 "With His Love (Sing Holy)" (Cox) - 4:23
 "Legacy of Love" (Morgan, Phelps) - 4:00
 "Bring Him Home" (Boublil, Kretzmer, Schönberg) - 4:13
 "The Star-Spangled Banner" (Key, Phelps, Smith) - 4:22
 "There Is a River" (Sapp, Sapp) - 5:18
 "Gentle Savior" (Brick, Matthews, Phelps) - 4:53
 "End of the Beginning" (Phelps) - 5:48

Awards

The album received a nomination two Dove Award nominations: Long Form Music Video of the Year and Inspirational Album of the Year, at the 38th GMA Dove Awards.

Chart performance

The album peaked at #28 on Billboard's Christian Albums and #44 on Heatseekers.

References

External links
Legacy of Love: David Phelps Live! on Amazon.com

2006 live albums
2006 video albums
Live video albums
David Phelps albums